Blue Amazon may refer to:
 Exclusive economic zone of Brazil, commonly known as the Blue Amazon (Portuguese: Amazônia Azul)
 Blue Amazon (group), an English electronic music act
 Wonder Woman: The Blue Amazon, a DC Comics comic book